Patricia Alberta "Page" Adler (née Hannah) is an American philanthropist and former actress.

Life and career 
Hannah was born in Chicago, Illinois. She is married to producer Lou Adler, and the couple have four sons. She is the younger sister of actress Daryl Hannah. Other relatives include Tanya Wexler, Haskell Wexler, Yale Wexler, and Don Wexler.

In 1999, Hannah and her husband founded The Painted Turtle Camp in Lake Hughes, California, along with Paul Newman. The camp is part of the Hole in the Wall Gang Camp network founded by Newman. The camp's programs give children with life-threatening illnesses and chronic medical conditions the opportunity to experience traditional camping experiences. The camp also has an outreach program that visits hospitals in the greater Los Angeles area. Hannah is currently chairman of the organization's board of directors.

Filmography

Film

Television

References

External links 
 The Painted Turtle official website
 
 

20th-century American actresses
20th-century American philanthropists
21st-century American actresses
21st-century philanthropists
Actresses from Chicago
American film actresses
American television actresses
American women philanthropists
Circle in the Square Theatre School alumni
Living people
Philanthropists from Illinois
20th-century women philanthropists
21st-century women philanthropists
Year of birth missing (living people)